Giselle Monne Washington (born 3 April 2001) is an American-born Jamaican footballer who plays as a midfielder for the Tennessee Lady Volunteers and the Jamaica women's national team.

Club career
She has committed to the University of Tennessee.

International career
Washington represented Jamaica at the 2016 CONCACAF Women's U-17 Championship, the 2016 CONCACAF Girls' U-15 Championship, the 2018 CONCACAF Women's U-20 Championship and the 2018 CONCACAF Women's U-17 Championship qualification. She made her senior debut in 2018.

International goals
Scores and results list Jamaica's goal tally first

Personal life
Her mother was born in Kingston.

References

External links

2001 births
Living people
Citizens of Jamaica through descent
Jamaican women's footballers
Women's association football midfielders
Women's association football defenders
Jamaica women's international footballers
People from Brookhaven, Georgia
Sportspeople from DeKalb County, Georgia
Soccer players from Georgia (U.S. state)
American women's soccer players
African-American women's soccer players
American sportspeople of Jamaican descent
Tennessee Volunteers women's soccer players
21st-century African-American sportspeople
21st-century African-American women